Okahandja railway station is a railway station serving the town of Okahandja in Namibia. It is part of the TransNamib Railway.

Okahandja is situated on the Windhoek—Swakopmund line, built in 1902 during Imperial Germany's colonial rule of German South West Africa. In 1914 this line was extended to Walvis Bay.

Okahandja is connected to a number of towns in the north of Namibia via the railway junction in Kranzberg, which lies on the Windhoek-Swakopmund-Walvis Bay route, and to the south and east of Namibia via Windhoek.

Gallery

See also
 Rail transport in Namibia

References

Railway stations in Namibia
TransNamib Railway
Okahandja
Buildings and structures in Otjozondjupa Region
1902 establishments in German South West Africa